Caloptilia kurokoi is a moth of the family Gracillariidae. It is known from China and Kyūshū, Japan.

The wingspan is about 15.5 mm.

The larvae feed on Acer rufinerve. They probably mine the leaves of their host plant.

References

kurokoi
Moths of Asia
Moths described in 1966